Bilenke Pershe is a village (a selo) in the Zaporizhzhia Raion (district) of Zaporizhzhia Oblast in southern Ukraine. Its population was 808 in the 2001 Ukrainian Census. Administratively, it belongs to the Bilenke rural hromada.

References

Zaporizhzhia Raion
Populated places on the Dnieper in Ukraine

Villages in Zaporizhzhia Raion